Shaun the Sheep is an adventure game developed by Art Co., Ltd and published by D3Publisher's America and Europe branches for the Nintendo DS handheld console. The game is based on the popular Aardman Animations series of the same name. The game was released on September 23, 2008 in the United States. In the game, Shaun must find and rescue the sheep before the farmer gets home.

Gameplay
Shaun is controlled by the control pad or the stylus while walking, exploring or solving problems in a fully 3D area with 3D characters around. While most sheep are not difficult to find, some sheep, like Timmy or Shirley, require a minigame to be started in order to be rescued. Every time enough achievements are reached, new areas are unlocked to find more sheep.

Plot
The sheep have escaped and Shaun must find the rest of the flock before the Farmer comes home. Gamers play as Shaun and interact with favorite characters such as Shirley, Timmy, Bitzer and more as they adventure through their favorite scenes and explore areas from the series like the junk pile, the sheep pool and the circus tent. Players utilize the DS touchscreen and microphone as they experience three different gameplay modes: Story Mode, Mini-game Mode and Collection Mode and maneuver around obstacles, access hidden areas, and try their hand at eight unlockable mini-games and eight collectible slide puzzles. Five “micro” games offer players more interactivity and depth by showcasing memorable moments from the show such as saving Timmy from the circus high wire or making a ball of wool to distract Pidsley the cat.

Reception

References

External links
 Shaun the Sheep Official Site
 Shaun the Sheep at IGN

Nintendo DS games
Nintendo DS-only games
Cancelled Xbox 360 games
Cancelled PlayStation 2 games
Cancelled Wii games
Cancelled PlayStation 3 games
D3 Publisher games
2008 video games
Video games developed in Japan
Wallace and Gromit video games
Single-player video games
Video games based on television series
Shaun the Sheep
Aardman Animations video games